The term crew car may also refer to a track speeder.
A crew car (also known as a relay van) is a passenger carriage specially fitted out for the use of train drivers. Interior fittings include a sleeping compartment for each crew member, a lounge area, kitchen, bathroom, and laundry. They are usually provided with an onboard generator system and air conditioning.

Background
They are used mainly on long-distance freight trains in Australia that travel with two crews, who alternate crewing the train on duty / off duty during the journey. The car is usually marshalled directly or a few carriages behind the locomotives. Most crew cars have been converted from older SAR, VR and NSWGR passenger cars or depowered SAR Bluebird Railcars.

Major Australian users of crew cars include One Rail Australia, Aurizon, Pacific National, and SCT Logistics and are predominantly found on routes between Adelaide, Darwin and Perth.

See also 
 Caboose
 Crew rest compartment
 Troop kitchen

References

External links
 Listing of Australian crew car operators

Freight rolling stock
Passenger railroad cars